World Victory Road Presents: Sengoku 10 was a mixed martial arts event promoted by World Victory Road on September 23, 2009. The event included three Gold Cup matches featuring the winners of Sengoku: Gold Cup South Korea versus the winners of Sengoku: Gold Cup Japan. It was broadcast live in North America on HDNet.

Results

See also
 World Victory Road
 List of Sengoku champions
 2009 in World Victory Road

References

World Victory Road events
2009 in mixed martial arts